Brandee Evans (born June 2, 1985) is an American actress and former choreographer, best known for her leading role in the Starz drama series P-Valley.

Life and career
Evans was born in Memphis, Tennessee. Her mother suffers from multiple sclerosis and Alzheimer's. Before her acting career, she worked as a high school English teacher. She began her acting career playing supporting roles in films including Beyond the Lights (2014), and appearing on TV miniseries The New Edition Story and The Bobby Brown Story. As a backup dancer, Evans appears with pop singer Katy Perry in 2010.

In 2020, Evans began starring as Mercedes in the Starz drama series P-Valley. She received positive reviews from critics for her performance. She was nominated for the NAACP Image Award for Outstanding Actress in a Drama Series.

Filmography

Film

Television

Awards and nominations

References

External links
 

Living people
African-American actresses
American television actresses
21st-century American actresses
Actresses from Tennessee
1991 births
21st-century African-American women
21st-century African-American people